Avon Lake City School District, or Avon Lake City Schools, is the public school district of Avon Lake, Ohio. Avon Lake City Schools serve approximately 3,500 students in grades K-12 with 250 teachers. The superintendent of Avon Lake City Schools’ is Bob Scott.

Schools
Avon Lake High School (Grades 9-12)
Learwood Middle School (Grades 7-8)
Troy Intermediate School (Grades 5-6)
Eastview Elementary School (Grades K-4)
Erieview Elementary School (Grades K-4)
Redwood Elementary School (Grades K-4)
Westview Elementary School (Grades K-4)

The Avon Lake City School District also provides busing to students of Saint Joseph Church School (Grades 1-8), though that school is not part of the district.

Avon Lake High School was listed as Number 170 in Newsweek's Top 500 U.S. High Schools in 2015.

References

External links
 http://www.avonlakecityschools.org/

Education in Lorain County, Ohio
School districts in Ohio